Meinloh von Sevelingen was a 12th Century Minnesänger from Swabia and one of the earliest poets in the tradition.

Life 
There is no documentary record of Meinloh's life. Sevelingen is modern Söflingen, now a part of the city of Ulm. Around 1240 a "Meinlohus de Sevelingen" is documented as the seneschal of Count Hartmann von Dillingen, but this is too late to be identified with the poet, who works are dated in stylistic grounds to 1160–1170. In all probability the poet was an ancestor of this documented namesake.

Works

Manuscripts
Meinloh's work is preserved in the two main Minnesang collections:
The Weingarten Manuscript (B), early 14th Century, contains 11 strophes under Meinloh's name.
The Codex Manesse (C), c. 1310, contains 14 strophes under Meinloh's name, including all those in B.
Both codices have a miniature.

The final two strophes in C are generally ascribed not to Meinloh but to Reinmar von Hagenau, since the first of them (Swem von guoten wîben liep geschiht) is duplicated later in the manuscript (folio 107r) under Reinmar's name.

Two of the strophes in B and C have been regarded as "inauthentic", that is, not written by Meinloh.

Form
The form of Meinloh's lyrics is characteristic of the early Danubian Minnesang: single-strophe works based on the "Langzeile" associated with the Nibelungenlied (a long line broken by a caesura)  and rhyming couplets with impure rhymes permitted.

However, he is also the first Minnesänger to show influence from the Rhineland and thus from the troubadours and trouvères. This is apparent in the tri-partite structure of most of his strophes, which have the seven-line rhyme-scheme aa|bb|cxc, an anticipation of the later classic canzona form ab|ab|cxc. The unrhymed sixth line (the "Waise" or "orphan") is a characteristic Romance import.

Commemoration 
Present-day Söflingen has a Meinloh-Straße, and Meinloh is commemorated as one of the four local "sons of the muses" on the public fountain in the centre of Söflingen. The local primary school is called the Meinloh-Grundchule, and the nearby Söflinger Meinloh-Forum is an open-air performance and event venue.

Example text
MHG text 
Ich sach boten des sumeres,    daz wâren bluomen alsô rôt.
weistu, schoene vrowe,    waz dir ein ritter enbôt?
    verholne sînen dienest;    im wart liebers nie niet.
    im trûret sîn herze,    sît er nu jungest von dir schiet.
        Nu hoehe im sîn gemüete    gegen dirre sumerzît.
            frô wirt er niemer,
        ê er an dînem arme    sô rehte güetliche gelît.

Translation
I saw the heralds of summer    they were flowers so red.
Do you know, fair lady,    what a knight has offered you?
    His service in secret;    nothing means more to him.
    His heart is sorrowful    since last he parted from you.
        Now raise his spirits    for this summertime.
           He will never be happy
        Until he lies in your arms    so contentedly.

See also
Minnesang
Der von Kürenberg
Dietmar von Aist

Notes

Editions

Sources

Further reading
 

Minnesingers
12th-century German poets
German male poets
Middle High German poets
Medieval German musicians
People from Ulm